Chen Yuxi (11 September 2005) is a Chinese diver.

Early life
Chen was born on 11 September 2005 to a family with gymnastics background. Her grandfather, Chen Xinxi, was a former gymnast. Her father, Chen Jian, is a gymnastics coach at the Shanghai Youth Sports School in Xuhui District, while her mother, Dong Chunhua, is an associate professor in the gymnastics teaching and research section at the Shanghai University of Sport.

Sports career
In 2008, she began to practice gymnastics and in 2011, she was selected by Shi Meiqin, the then Shanghai diving team leader, to practice diving. At the beginning of 2017, Chen entered the Shanghai diving team for training.

In September 2018, Chen won the women's single 10m platform diving championship and mixed synchronized 10m platform (with Yu Duan) at the National Diving Championships in Chongqing. In March 2019, she was selected for the Chinese National Diving Team and in May, she 
participated in the 10th FINA Diving World Series, and won gold medal at the women's 10m single platform and synchronised 10m platform (with Yuan Haoyan).

On 1 July 2019, she was selected to be in Chinese diving team for the 18th FINA World Aquatics Championships in Gwangju. At the event, she won a gold medal in women's single 10m platform with 439 points. On September 24, at the National Diving Championships in Yantai, Chen won the women's single 10m platform with 428.85 points. Partnering with Zhang Jiaqi, the duo won the women's 10m synchronized platform with 342.54 points.

At the 2020 Summer Olympics in Tokyo, Chen and Zhang won the gold medal in the women's 10m synchronized platform on 27 July 2021. On August 5, she won the silver medal in women's single 10m platform.

At the 2021 National Games of China in Shaanxi, Chen and Zhang won the gold medal in the women's 10m platform on September 9. On September 12, she won the silver medal in the women's single 10m platform.

At the 19th FINA World Championships 2022 held in Budapest, Chen took part in the women's single 10m platform as a defending champion. She won the gold medal again with a score of 417.25. Quan Hongchan, who was gold medalist in 2020 Summer Olympics, came second with a score of 416.95.

Awards and honors
China Youth May Fourth Medal (9 August 2021)
National May 1st Labour Medal (September 2021)
Advanced Worker of National Sports System (24 September 2021)

Other activities
On 21 September 2021, Chen participated in Dragon TV show 'Moon in the East - Mid-Autumn Dream Night', where she sang the song "One Hundred Years" with Liao Changyong, Huang Baomei and Huang Xuechen.

On 26 December 2021, the music video for 2022 Winter Olympics "See You in Beijing" sung by 55 Olympic champions, including Chen Yuxi, was released.

References

2005 births
Living people
Chinese female divers
World Aquatics Championships medalists in diving
Olympic medalists in diving
Olympic gold medalists for China
Olympic silver medalists for China
Medalists at the 2020 Summer Olympics
Divers at the 2020 Summer Olympics
Olympic divers of China
Divers from Shanghai
21st-century Chinese women